Michael C. Davis (Chinese name ) is an American academic who currently serves as Global Fellow at the Woodrow Wilson International Center for Scholars in Washington, DC. He is also an affiliate research scholar at the US Asia Law Institute at New York University, a research associate at Columbia University and the Professor of Law and International Affairs at India's O.P. Jindal Global University.

Until stepping down in 2016, he was professor in the Law Faculty at the University of Hong Kong, where he returns occasionally as a visiting professor.

He holds degrees from Ohio State University (BA), the University of California (JD) and Yale University (LLM).

His books include Making Hong Kong China: The Rollback of Human Rights and the Rule of Law (2020), International Intervention in the Post-Cold War World (2004), Human Rights and Chinese Values (1995), and Constitutional Confrontation in Hong Kong (1990). His articles have appeared in leading scholarly journals in law and political science.

Before moving to Hong Kong, as a Hawaii attorney, he worked for the Native Hawaiian Legal Corporation on indigenous rights and land use issues. As a public intellectual and human rights advocate in Hong Kong, he was a founder of both the Article 23 Concern Group and the Article 45 Concern Group which led massive protests for human rights in 2003 and 2004. His human rights work has also included a nearly two decade engagement on the Tibet issue and on human rights and development issues across Asia.

Academic career 
Davis has held numerous academic positions in several leading academic institutions, including the J. Landis Martin Visiting Professorship in Human Rights at Northwestern University, the Robert and Marion Short Visiting Professorship at Notre Dame University and the Frederick K. Cox Professorship at Case Western Reserve University, as well as the Schell Senior Fellowship in Human Rights at Yale Law School.

He is an affiliate scholar at the Liu Institute for Asia Studies at the University of Notre Dame and was a 2016–2017 Reagan-Fascell Democracy Fellow, at the National Endowment for Democracy, where his research related to "resistance movements and constitutionalism in emerging democracies in Asia."

Davis held the Wilson Center Residential Fellowship for 2018–2019 at the Woodrow Wilson International Center in Washington, DC where his project title was "Reversing the Liberal Retreat and Establishing Constitutionalism in Emerging Democracies in Asia."

His contributions to higher education were recognised in the "Award for Distinguished Service and Outstanding Contribution to the Field of Higher Education in India," awarded by the O.P. Jindal Global University in 2015 and in a "Certificate of Commendation" from the International Committee for the Red Cross, in regard to his contribution to the founding in 2011 of the Asian Regional Humanitarian Law Moot Competition.

Publications

Books 
Making Hong Kong China: The Rollback of Human Rights and the Rule of Law, (New York: Columbia University Press, AAS Series, 2020) (author)
International Intervention in the Post-Cold War World: Moral Responsibility and Power Politics, (New York: M.E. Sharpe, 2004) (lead editor)
Human Rights and Chinese Values: Legal, Philosophical and Political Perspectives (Oxford University Press, 1995) (editor)
The Aftermath of the 1989 Crisis in Mainland China (Boulder: Westview Press, 1992) (co-editor)
Constitutional Confrontation in Hong Kong (London: Macmillan Press, 1990; New York: St. Martins Press, 1990) (author)

Recent journal articles 
"Hong Kong: How Beijing Perfected Repression," Journal of Democracy, Vol. 33/1, January, 2022
“Beijing’s Crackdown on Human Rights and the Rule of Law in Hong Kong,” Asia Policy, Vol. 16/2, April 2021 
"Strengthening Constitutionalism in Asia," Journal of Democracy, Vol. 28 (October 2017) pp. 147–161. www.journalofdemocracy.org/article/strengthening-constitutionalism-asia
"The Basic Law, Universal Suffrage and the Rule of Law in Hong Kong," Hastings International and Comparative Law Review, Vol. 38/2, Spring, 2016, pp. 275–298.
"Can International Law Help Resolve the Conflicts Over Uninhabited Islands in the East China Sea?", Denver Journal of International Law, Vol. 43/2 (2015) pp. 119–163.
"Tibet and China's National Minority Policies," Orbis,  Vol. 56/3, (2012),  pp. 429–446

Human rights advocacy 
In response to the Hong Kong Government's proposed draft legislation on national security under the Hong Kong Basic Law Article 23, which proposal raised worries on infringement of freedom of assembly and expression, Davis and eight other prominent Hong Kong lawyers founded the Article 23 Concern Group (later renamed to Article 45 Concern Group) in 2003. The Article 23 Concern Group led the massive protest against the proposed legislation. The Hong Kong government later withdrew the legislative proposal after more than 500,000 people protested against the proposal, one of the largest protests after the 1997 handover of Hong Kong to China. As a result of these efforts, he was the joint recipient, along with his Article 23 Concern Group colleagues, of the 2004 Human Rights and Democracy Award, awarded by the Chinese Democratic Education Foundation. As reflected in his recent book on the 2019 protests and the crackdown under the 2020 National Security Law, as well as numerous commentary, he has continued this engagement up to the present.

Davis has advocated for political reform and universal suffrage in Hong Kong and around Asia for more than two decades. His prolific commentary have been seen in newspapers such as The New York Times, the South China Morning Post, the Washington Post, the Nikkei Business Magazine, Foreign Affairs, and the Apple Daily, as well as quasi-academic media such as Yale Global. He has appeared for interviews on crucial human rights topics in such broadcast media as CNN, the BBC, National Public Radio and NBC News. He expressed his sympathy for the 2014 Hong Kong Umbrella Movement and argued non-violent civil disobedience did not undermine rule of law in Hong Kong, that the government's loose interpretation of the Basic Law posed a greater threat. As a result of his numerous commentaries that year, Amnesty International, the Hong Kong Journalist Association, and the Hong Kong Foreign Correspondence Club awarded him the 2014 Human Rights Press Award for commentary. He has remained a consistent public voice against the ongoing crackdown in Hong Kong following the imposition of the national security law.

References 

American expatriate academics
American expatriates in India
American expatriates in Hong Kong
1949 births
Living people
Haryana academics
Academic staff of the University of Hong Kong